Richard Thomas Edwards (born 20 November 1942 - 14 december 2022) was an English former professional footballer who played as a central defender for numerous clubs, including Aston Villa, Mansfield Town, Torquay United, and Notts County.

He is also a country musician who has released several singles and albums, including "Torquay United's War Cry" while a player for that club in 1972.

References

 Notts County Former Players' Association (Benevolent Fund)
 7" discography

1942 births
Living people
English footballers
Notts County F.C. players
Mansfield Town F.C. players
Aston Villa F.C. players
Torquay United F.C. players
English male singers
People from Kirkby-in-Ashfield
Footballers from Nottinghamshire
Association football defenders